Heather Menzies Urich (December 3, 1949 – December 24, 2017) was a Canadian–American model and actress, known for her roles as Louisa von Trapp in the 1965 film The Sound of Music and Jessica 6 in the TV series Logan's Run.

Early life
Heather Margaret Brotherston Menzies was born in Toronto on December 3, 1949, to Scottish parents who had emigrated to Canada after the war. Her father was a struggling artist. By Menzies' 14th birthday, she had lived in Vancouver, Miami, London, and Southern California. She had a younger sister, Sheila, and an older brother, Neil, who died in 2019.

Menzies was a graduate of John Burroughs High School in Burbank, California, in 1967, and she studied at Falcon Studio's University of the Arts.

Career
Menzies' first appearance on-screen was in 1964, when she appeared in the TV series The Farmer's Daughter. She was cast in The Sound of Music as Louisa, the third-oldest of the von Trapp children, at age 14, with no prior acting experience. Menzies sang "So Long, Farewell" and the "Lonely Goatherd" in the film.

Menzies went on to appear in a number of television series such as Alias Smith and Jones, T. J. Hooker, Dragnet, Room 222, Bonanza, Marcus Welby, M.D. and The Bob Newhart Show. She starred as Jessica 6 in the short-lived TV series Logan's Run. In addition, Menzies appeared in Hawaii, How Sweet It Is!, Hail, Hero!, Piranha, and Endangered Species.

Menzies was featured in Playboy magazine during 1973 in a pictorial titled "Tender Trapp", in reference to her The Sound of Music role. She was later cast in four television films: The Keegans, James Dean, Tail Gunner Joe, and Captain America.

Personal life
Menzies married John Cluett in 1969 and divorced him in 1973. She married Robert Urich in 1975. Urich and Menzies first met in 1974 while filming a commercial in which they "got married." They adopted 3 children. After Urich's death in 2002, Menzies established the Robert Urich Foundation and spent most of her time in her last years devoted to the organization, which raises money for cancer research and support for cancer patients.

Death
Menzies-Urich was diagnosed with terminal brain cancer in November 2017. She died on December 24, 2017.

Filmography

TV and Film

References

External links

 
 
 
 
 Interview with Heather Menzies Urich at Classic Film & TV Cafe

1949 births
2017 deaths
Canadian emigrants to the United States
20th-century American actresses
American people of Scottish descent
American film actresses
American television actresses
Actresses from Toronto
Canadian film actresses
Canadian television actresses
Canadian people of Scottish descent
Deaths from brain tumor
Deaths from cancer in Ontario
21st-century American women